In the geologic timescale, the Sheinwoodian is the age of the  Wenlock Epoch of the Silurian Period of the Paleozoic Era of the Phanerozoic Eon that is comprehended between 433.4 ± 0.8 Ma and 430.5 ± 0.7 Ma (million years ago), approximately. The Sheinwoodian Age succeeds the Telychian Age and precedes the Homerian Age.

Definition 
The Wenlock-Llandovery boundary is defined by the first occurrence of Cyrtograptus centrifugus. The stage is named after Sheinwood village, north of Much Wenlock. The Buildwas Formation of Shropshire, United Kingdom contains the type section.

References 

 
Wenlock epoch
Silurian geochronology